The 1935 Belmont Stakes was the 67th running of the Belmont Stakes. It was the 29th Belmont Stakes held at Belmont Park in Elmont, New York and was held on June 8, 1935. With a field of five horses, Omaha, the winner of that year's Preakness Stakes and Kentucky Derby won the 1 –mile race (12 f; 2.4 km) by 1  lengths over Firethorn.

Win the win, Omaha became the third Triple Crown champion.

Results

References

External links 
BelmontStakes.com

Belmont Stakes races
Belmont Stakes
Belmont Stakes
Belmont Stakes